Arenberg Castle is a Flemish Renaissance style château in Heverlee, close to Leuven, Belgium. It is surrounded by a park.

Built in place of a 12th century medieval castle, the current château was started in the 16th century but still underwent many changes in the following centuries. In 1612, it passed into the hands of the Arenberg family, who occupied it until the First World War. The building is now owned by the Katholieke Universiteit Leuven (KU Leuven).

History

The site had been the castle of the lords of Heverlee since the 12th century, but this family became impoverished and had to sell the site in 1445 to the Croÿ family from Picardy. Antoine I de Croÿ demolished the medieval castle and started works to build the current château in 1455 on the site, of which he destroyed all but one tower. His grandson, William de Croÿ, completed the works on the château in 1515, and founded a monastery on the château grounds for the Benedictine Celestines. The architectural style is in large part traditionally Flemish, with sandstone window frames and brick walls, though it has been structurally altered since 1515 and has elements of Gothic, Renaissance, and neo-Gothic architecture. Its large corner towers are typical, once surmounted by a German eagle. Charles III of Croy was the 4th and last duke, and after his death in 1612 without issue the château passed to the of the German House of Arenberg into which his sister had married, and remained in that family until the First World War.
 
Even before the First World War, the 8th duke of Arenberg wanted to sell the château and its grounds to the old Catholic University of Leuven, for a reasonable price. During the First World War, the château and grounds were occupied by the Germans and Austrians. The château and park were seized by the Belgian Government on the outbreak of, and then after the war, since the Arenberg family was considered to be German or Austrian due to their close Habsburg connection, monarchs of Austria-Hungary. It took until 1921 for the University to acquire them, becoming an expanded natural sciences and engineering campus in the style of that of an American university. After the partitioning of the university along language lines in 1968, the château and grounds remained with the Dutch speaking half as one of the main campuses for the new, independent Katholieke Universiteit Leuven (KU Leuven). The château itself is the main building of the Faculty of Engineering and houses lecture rooms and studios for the Department of Architecture, Urbanism and Urban Planning, including the Post-Graduate Centre Human Settlements and the Raymond Lemaire International Centre for Conservation (named after Raymond M. Lemaire). The building is open to the public. The former Celestine monastery on the château grounds now houses the campus library, and the addresses of many of the science buildings are on the street named Celestijnenlaan (Dutch for "Celestine Street").

See also
List of castles in Belgium

References

External links
 Local tourism information

Arenberg
Arenberg
Buildings and structures in Leuven